

Overview

Name of constituency

PP-155 XIX Lahore Cantonment

Brief introduction
There are 9 union councils in the Provincial Assembly Constituency.

Each union council consists of 15,000 to 20,000 registered voters. In fact, PP-155 is a Cantonment Board area and it is controlled and monitored by the army, so there is no local-body system.

The last election of local bodies was held in 1991.

The total number of registered voters was 164,446 in the 2008 election.

Main developed areas

Defence Housing Authority (DHA) Phase 1 to 5 and 8, Punjab Society, Sui Gass Society, Fort Villas.

Underdeveloped areas

Iqbal Park, Super Town, Al-Ameen Society, Nayab Sector.

Poor areas

Chungi Amer Sidhu, Fardous Park, Shaukat Town, Amer Sidhu Pind, Farooq Colony, Model Colony 1, 2, Qadri Colony, Peer Colony, Keer Kot.

Rural areas

There are many villages in provincial constituency PP-155. Some are developed and surrounded by DHA and other societies. But some have very poor conditions and facilities.

 Charer  (surrounded by DHA)
 Keer Kot and Keer Khurad (surrounded by DHA phase 2, 3, 4 and other societies)
 Amersidhu  (surrounded by DHA phase 2 and other societies)
 Koray (surrounded by DHA phase 3, main Walton road and other societies)
 Chung Khurad  (at Charar drain and surrounded by DHA phase 4 and other societies)
 Manawala  (at main Badian road and surrounded by DHA phase 5 and other societies)
 Bhatta Kohar  (at main Badian road and link with KB colony and other societies)
 Gohawa  (at main Airport road and surrounded by DHA phase 8 and other societies)
 Sehijpal (at main Airport road and surrounded by DHA phase 8 and other societies)
 Malik Pur (at main Airport road and surrounded by DHA phase 8 and other societies)
 Alpha Jhugian (at main Airport road and surrounded by DHA phase 8 and other societies)
 Dair Pindi  (at main Airport road and surrounded by DHA phase 8 and other societies)
 Bao Wala (at main Barkee road and surrounded by DHA phase 8 and other societies)
 Jindra and Jindra Khurd  (at main Barkee road and surrounded by DHA phase 6, 7 and 8)
 Durag Pura  (at main Barkee road and surrounded by DHA phase 6, 7 and other societies)
 Chacho Wali  (at main Badian road and surrounded by DHA phase 5 and other societies)

Elections results 2008

 Registered voters: 	164,446
 Votes polled:		57,914
 Valid votes:		57,834
 Rejected votes:		801
 Percentage of votes polled: 35.22%

MPA
Mian Naseer Ahmed was elected as Member of Provincial Assembly of the Punjab (MPA) in 2008. He belongs to the Pakistan Muslim League (N) (PML-N) political party.
in 1985 Qazi Abdul hakeem elected as a member of provincial Assembly of the Punjab as an indipandent candidate

Ranking of political parties

 Pakistan Muslim League (N)
 Pakistan Tehreek-e-Insaf
 Pakistan Peoples Party Parliamentarians
 Other parties

References

 https://web.archive.org/web/20110726072544/http://www2.ecp.gov.pk/vsite/ElectionResult/Search.aspx?constituency=PA&constituencyid=PP-155
 http://www.pap.gov.pk/index.php/members/profile/en/19/616
 https://web.archive.org/web/20100802142528/http://wcb.gov.pk/index.aspx
 https://web.archive.org/web/20100322203721/http://www.pmln.org.pk/parlamentryparty_punjab.php
 http://www.pmln.110mb.com/winner_candidates_list_of_punjab.htm
 https://web.archive.org/web/20140522001817/http://www.votepk.com/province-assemblies/punjab-assembly-pp/pp-155-lahore-xix/pp-155-election-2013-results-final/

PP-155
Lahore